The Affero General Public License (Affero GPL and informally Affero License) is a free software license. The first version of the Affero General Public License (AGPLv1), was published by Affero, Inc. in March 2002, and based on the GNU General Public License, version 2 (GPLv2).  The second version (AGPLv2) was published in November 2007, as a transitional license to allow an upgrade path from AGPLv1 to the GNU Affero General Public License (a variant of the original Affero GPL license that is compatible with GPLv3).

Both versions of the Affero GPL were designed to close a perceived application service provider (ASP) loophole in the ordinary GPL, where, by using but not distributing the software, the copyleft provisions are not triggered. Each version differs from the version of the GNU GPL on which it is based in having an added provision addressing use of software over a computer network. This provision requires that the full source code be made available to any network user of the AGPL-licensed work, typically a web application.

History
In 2000, while developing an e-learning and e-service business model, Henry Poole met with Richard Stallman in Amsterdam where they discussed the ASP loophole in GPLv2. Over the following months, Stallman and Poole discussed approaches to solve the problem. In 2001, Poole founded Affero Inc. (a web services business), and he needed a license that would require distribution by other organizations who used Affero code to create derivative web services. At that time, Poole contacted Bradley M. Kuhn and Eben Moglen of the Free Software Foundation to get advice on a new license that would close the ASP loophole in GPLv2.

Around late February 2002, Kuhn suggested, based on the idea of a quine (a program that prints its own source code), that GPLv2 be supplemented with a section 2(d) that would require derivative works to maintain a "download source" feature that would provide complete and corresponding source code.  Kuhn argued that there was precedent for such a requirement in GPLv2 section 2(c), which required preserving certain features by downstream distributors and modifiers.

Moglen and Kuhn wrote the text of the proposed new section 2(d), and provided it to Poole, who then requested and received permission from the FSF to publish a derivative of GPLv2 for this purpose. In March 2002, Affero, Inc. published the original Affero General Public License (AGPLv1) for use with the Affero project and made the new license available for use by other software-as-a-service developers.

The FSF contemplated including the special provision of AGPLv1 into GPLv3 but ultimately decided to publish a separate license, nearly identical to GPLv3 but containing a provision similar in purpose and effect to section 2(d) of AGPLv1.  The new license was named the GNU Affero General Public License. Retaining the Affero name indicated its close historic relationship with AGPLv1.  The GNU AGPL was given version number 3 for parity with the GPL, and the current GNU Affero General Public License is often abbreviated AGPLv3.

The finalized version of GNU AGPLv3 was published by the FSF on November 19, 2007.

Compatibility with the GPL 
Both versions of the AGPL, like the corresponding versions of the GNU GPL on which they are based, are strong copyleft licenses. In the Free Software Foundation's judgment, the added requirement in section 2(d) of Affero GPL v1 made it incompatible with the otherwise nearly identical GPLv2.  That is to say, one cannot distribute a single work formed by combining components covered by each license.

By contrast, GPLv3 and AGPLv3 each include clauses (in section 13 of each license) that together achieve a form of mutual compatibility for the two licenses. These clauses explicitly allow the "conveying" of a work formed by linking code licensed under the one license against code licensed under the other license, despite the licenses otherwise not allowing relicensing under the terms of each other.

To establish an upgrade path from Affero's original AGPLv1 to the GNU AGPLv3, Affero, Inc. published the Affero General Public License version 2 in November 2007, which is merely a transitional license that allows recipients of  software licensed under "AGPLv1 or any later version as published by Affero, Inc." to distribute the software, or derivative works, under the GNU AGPLv3 or any later version.

References

External links 
Internet Archive 2018 snapshot of AGPL Frequently Asked Questions Affero
Internet Archive 2018 snapshot of AGPL text Affero

Computer law
Free and open-source software licenses
Copyleft